Omkar 1973 Worli is a residential multi-skyscraper project located in Worli, Mumbai, Maharastra, India. It is a 3-tower development by Omkar Realtors. The project is expected to be completed by 2023.

Composition
Omkar 1973 towers will have 400-plus sky bungalows, ranging from 2,500 sq. ft. to 18,200 sq. ft. area. It will have a height of around 267 meters and an area of about 5,000,000 sq. ft. The project will consists of 3 equally tall skyscrapers which are Omkar 1973 towers A, B, and C, all 73 stories tall. All towers will have 3 floors underground for parking.

Associations & Design
The towers are designed by Fosters+Partners and interior of these towers are done by Hirsch Bedner Associates (HBA), UK.

Current Status 

Currently, Sales for Freehold apartment are on hold as directed by Bombay Hight Court due to Non Payment of Rent to the slum-dwellers.

See also
List of tallest buildings in Mumbai
List of tallest buildings in India
List of tallest buildings and structures in the Indian subcontinent
List of tallest buildings in Asia
List of tallest buildings in different cities in India
List of tallest residential buildings

References

Buildings and structures under construction in India
Residential skyscrapers in Mumbai